Trygve Nygaard (born 19 August 1975) is a retired Norwegian footballer.

External links
100% Fotball (Norwegian Premier League statistics)
nifs.no Profile

1975 births
Living people
People from Haugesund
FK Haugesund players
Viking FK players
Norwegian footballers
SK Vard Haugesund players
Eliteserien players
Association football midfielders
Sportspeople from Rogaland